KBUL (970 kHz) is an American conservative news/talk AM radio station that broadcasts in the Billings Metro Area of the U.S. state of Montana. The station features the following radio personalities: Dan Bongino, Sean Hannity, Glenn Beck, Coast to Coast AM with George Noory, and Billings Morning News. KBUL AM was simulcasting sister station KCTR-FM until September 2001 and most recently simulcasting sister station KCHH until August 2022.

On August 15, 2022, KBUL rebranded as "News Talk 103.3FM 970AM" and split from simulcasting with KCHH.

Ownership
In October 2007, a deal was reached for KBUL to be acquired by GAP Broadcasting II LLC (Samuel Weller, president) from Clear Channel Communications as part of a 57 station deal with a total reported sale price of $74.78 million.  What eventually became GapWest Broadcasting was folded into Townsquare Media on August 13, 2010.

References

External links
KBUL official website

FCC History Cards for KBUL

BUL
News and talk radio stations in the United States
Radio stations established in 1951
1951 establishments in Montana
Townsquare Media radio stations